Marie-Andrée Corneille is a Canadian actress from Quebec. She is most noted for her role in the 1996 film Mistaken Identity (Erreur sur la personne), for which she was a Genie Award nominee for Best Supporting Actress at the 17th Genie Awards.

She also appeared in the films La fête des rois and The Left-Hand Side of the Fridge (La moitié gauche du frigo), and the television series Watatatow, Malo Korrigan and the Space Tracers and Les Soeurs Elliot. She has not had an onscreen role since 2007, but continues to do voice work as a documentary film narrator and in French-language dubbing of Hollywood films.

References

External links

Living people
Actresses from Quebec
Canadian film actresses
Canadian television actresses
Canadian voice actresses
French Quebecers
20th-century Canadian actresses
21st-century Canadian actresses
Year of birth missing (living people)